Crematogaster brevimandibularis is a species of ant in tribe Crematogastrini. It was described by Donisthorpe in 1943.

References

brevimandibularis
Insects described in 1943